Sakura Uchikoshi (born Sakura Muraki on January 6, 1968 in Hokkaido, Japan) is a Japanese politician who has served as a member of the House of Councillors of Japan since 2019. She represents the Niigata at-large district and is a member of the Constitutional Democratic Party of Japan.

She is a member of the following committees (as of 2021):
 Committee on Health, Welfare and Labour
 Committee on Budget
 Special Committee on North Korean Abduction Issue and Related Matters
 Commission on the Constitution

References 

1968 births
Living people
Members of the House of Councillors (Japan)